Abderrahmane Bourdim (born 14 June 1994) is an Algerian footballer who currently plays for CR Belouizdad in the Algerian Ligue Professionnelle 1.

In July 2016, Bourdim extended his contract with USM Alger until 2021 and was also loaned out to JS Saoura for two seasons.

References

External links
 
 

1994 births
Algerian footballers
Algerian Ligue Professionnelle 1 players
JS Saoura players
Living people
People from El Eulma
RC Relizane players
USM Alger players
Association football midfielders
Algeria international footballers
21st-century Algerian people